USS Sitka has been the name of more than one United States Navy ship, and may refer to:

 USS Sitka (PF-94), a patrol frigate renamed  in 1944 while under construction
 , an attack transport in commission from 1945 to 1946

United States Navy ship names